The Battle of Leptis Parva was fought in 238 BC between a Carthaginian army of over 30,000 commanded by Hamilcar Barca and Hanno, and approximately 20,000 mutinous foreign soldiers who had served Carthage and North African rebels under Matho in the North African province of Byzacium (in modern Tunisia). The battle was the final major conflict of the Mercenary War and resulted in a decisive victory for the Carthaginians.

In 241 BC 20,000 foreign troops who had been employed by Carthage during the First Punic War (264 to 241 BC) mutinied under the leadership of Spendius and Mathos starting the Mercenary War. They were supported by an uprising of Carthage's African neighbors and 70,000 local recruits flocked to join them, bringing supplies and finance. War-weary Carthage fared poorly in the initial engagements of the war, especially under the leadership of Hanno. Hamilcar Barca was given supreme command in 239 BC and slowly turned the tide.

Hanno reconciled with Hamilcar and with a larger Carthaginian army they pursued the rebels, harrying their march. After three months of manoeuvres, in which the rebels consistently came off worst, battle was given and the rebels were completely defeated. The remaining rebellious cities rapidly surrendered or were captured by the Carthaginians, ending the war.

Background 

In 241 BC 20,000 foreign troops who had been employed by Carthage in the fighting on Sicily during the First Punic War (264 to 241 BC) were recalled to the Carthaginian homeland in North Africa (in what is now Tunisia) to be paid and despatched home. A dispute over the payment of wages owed developed and late in the year the troops mutinied under the leadership of Spendius and Matho starting the Mercenary War. They were supported by an uprising of Carthage's oppressed dependent territories and 70,000 Africans flocked to join them, bringing supplies and finance.

War-weary Carthage fared poorly in the initial engagements of the war, especially under the generalship of Hanno, and was under blockade for most of the war. At some point during 240 BC the Carthaginians raised another, smaller, force, which was placed under the command of Hamilcar Barca, who had commanded the Carthaginian forces on Sicily for the last six years of the First Punic War. After a significant victory over a rebel army led by Spendius at the Battle of the Bagradas River Hamilcar was given joint command of the army. Hamilcar and Hanno were political opponents and had different approaches to fighting the war, so there was no military cooperation between them. Hamilcar campaigned successfully, initially demonstrating leniency in an attempt to woo the rebels over. To ensure a great hatred between the armies, and so prevent their men being tempted to desert to the Carthaginians, in 240 BC Spendius tortured 700 Carthaginian prisoners to death, and henceforth the war was pursued with great brutality. Hamilcar was given supreme command in 239 BC.

Meanwhile, the rebels under Mathos had blockaded the Carthaginian-supporting cities of Utica and Hippo (modern Bizerte) and put an army under Spendius into the field. Eventually the rebel field army was destroyed and Spendius captured and crucified. This was the capital of the prosperous Byzacium region and had risen against Carthage earlier in the war. The historian Dexter Hoyos speculates that the rebels may have been hoping to leave the area by sea.

Battle 

The Carthaginian Senate encouraged reconciliation between Hanno and Hamilcar, and they agreed to serve together. The pair marched after the rebels with an army totalling perhaps 25,000 including every Carthaginian citizen of military age. On this occasion Hanno and Hamilcar cooperated well together and harassed the rebels on their march. The rebels were forced into a succession of unsuccessful skirmishes in Byzacium as the Carthaginians attempted to wear them down. Mathos, rather than wait to be besieged, decided to meet the Carthaginians in open battle in mid- to late 238 BC. As the rebels were by now in extremis Mathos called in every available man, stripping all rebel-held towns of garrisons. As the rebels' situation had worsened, they had increasingly suffered from desertions. Few of the original mutineers remained, after the previous three years of fierce campaigning, to participate in this battle; most of the rebel army was made up of indigenous North Africans. The Carthaginian army on the other hand, was steadily reinforced and had grown to over 30,000 men and a large number of war elephants. 

Battle was given eight to ten weeks after the two armies arrived in Byzacium, although the location is not known. Few details of the battle survive. It was a set piece battle, with no subtleties of manoeuvreMathos was not a proficient general and the Carthaginians were so superior that they felt no need for stratagems. Hamilcar was the senior Carthaginian commander and he ensured that the rebels were crushed, with few losses to the Carthaginians. In a change of policy, prisoners were taken, which probably helped to ensure that there was no desperate last stand. Captives were sold into slavery. Mathos was also captured, and he was dragged through the streets of Carthage and tortured to death by its inhabitants.

Aftermath
Most of the towns and cities which had not already come to terms with Carthage now did so, with the exceptions of Utica and Hippo, whose inhabitants feared vengeance for their massacre of Carthaginians. They attempted to hold out, but Polybius says that they too "quickly" surrendered, probably in late 238 or very early 237 BC. The towns and cities that surrendered were treated leniently, although Carthaginian governors were imposed on them. Immediately after the war Hamilcar led many of his veterans on an expedition to expand Carthaginian holdings in southern Iberia; this was to become a semi-autonomous Barcid fiefdom. In 218 BC a Carthaginian army under Hannibal besieged the Roman-protected town of Saguntum in eastern Iberia, providing the spark which ignited the Second Punic War.

Notes, citations and sources

Notes

Citations

Sources

 

 

 

 

 

 

 

 

 

 

 

238 BC
Leptis Parva
Leptis Parva
Leptis Parva